Thawatchaia is a genus of flowering plants belonging to the family Podostemaceae.

The genus name of Thawatchaia is in honour of Thawatchai Santisuk (b. 1944), a Thai herbarium director in Bangkok, and also, Thawatchai Wongprasert (fl. 2000), a plant collector. It was first described and published in Acta Phytotax. Geobot. Vol.55 on page 66 in 2004.

It is native range to Thailand and Laos.

Known species
Accepted by Kew:
Thawatchaia laotica 
Thawatchaia trilobata

References

Podostemaceae
Malpighiales genera
Plants described in 2004
Flora of Thailand
Flora of Laos